The Bornean banded pitta (Hydrornis schwaneri) is a species of bird in the family Pittidae. It is found only in Borneo. It was formerly considered conspecific with the Javan and Malayan banded pittas.  Together, they were referenced as the banded pitta.

References

Rheindt, F.E., and J.A. Eaton. 2010. Biological species limits in the Banded Pitta Pitta guajana. Forktail number 26: 86–91.

Bornean banded pitta
Endemic birds of Borneo
Bornean banded pitta
Taxa named by Charles Lucien Bonaparte